GX3 may refer to:

Aircraft
 Burnelli GX-3, an American twin-engined, mid-wing experimental aircraft

Automobiles
 Geely GX3, a 2017–present Chinese subcompact crossover
 Volkswagen GX3, a 2006 German sports car concept
 Zhongxing GX3, a 2014 Chinese subcompact crossover concept